Joseph Martin (c. 1649 – 16 August 1729) was a London merchant and politician who sat in the British House of Commons in 1701 and from 1710 to 1715.

Martin was born about 1649 and became a merchant trading primarily with the Baltic, although he was also a member of the Levant Company and of the New East India Company.

In 1701 Martin was briefly MP for Ipswich before acting as a consul in Moscow from 1702 to 1705. He was returned as MP for Hastings in 1710 but was defeated in 1715 and did not stand for parliament again. From 1710 to 1715, he was a director of the South Sea Company. He was knighted on 22 July 1712 and was Commissary for commercial negotiations with France from 1713 to 1715.

Martin died on 16 August 1729, aged 80. He had married and had 3 sons and 3 daughters.

References

|-

1649 births
1729 deaths
Members of the Parliament of England (pre-1707) for Ipswich
English MPs 1701
Members of the Parliament of Great Britain for English constituencies
British MPs 1710–1713
British MPs 1713–1715